A multi-way bridge is a bridge with three or more distinct and separate spans, where one end of each span meets at a common point near the centre of the bridge.  Unlike other bridges which have two entry-exit points, multi-way bridges have three or more entry-exit points.  For this reason, multi-way bridges are not to be confused with commonly found road bridges which carry vehicles in one direction from one entry point, and then bifurcate into two other one-way bridges.

Description
Multi-way bridges are located throughout the world, though they are rare. Some are as small as a footbridge, while others are multi-lane roadways.

Three-way bridges are often referred to as "T-bridges" or "Y-bridges", due to their shape when viewed from above.  Three cities in Michigan each have a three-way bridge named "Tridge", combining "tri" and "bridge": The Tridge (Midland, Michigan), The Tridge (Ypsilanti, Michigan) and The Tridge in Brighton, Michigan.

The unique shape of a multi-way bridge makes it easy to identify from an airplane.  Pilot Amelia Earhart described Zanesville, Ohio as "the most recognizable city in the country" because of its Y-shaped bridge, and the pilots of Enola Gay aimed for Hiroshima's T-shaped Aioi Bridge when they dropped the atom bomb.

While designing the Tripartite Bridge in 1846—a Y-bridge proposed to span the Allegheny River and Monongahela River in Pittsburgh, Pennsylvania—engineer John A. Roebling identified one of the challenges of erecting a three-way suspension-type bridge.  Suspension-bridge cables on two-way bridges support heavy loads and are anchored solidly at either end, while on a three-way bridge the cables of each of the three spans need to anchor at a central pier in the water, where cable forces from each span would have to balance each another: "the intersection of the cables at the top of the center pier...would have created enormous horizontal forces, and the stone arches connecting the three towers could hardly have resisted the tensions imposed by the cables radiating from their tops." The bridge was never built.

Three-way bridges

Four-way bridges

Five-way bridge

References